The W. Scott Stuart House is a historic home located at West Union, Doddridge County, West Virginia. It was built about 1905, and is a three-story, frame dwelling, with a two-story front portico with Ionic order columns, wrap-around porch, and an opulent interior in a transitional Queen Anne style.  It features circular twin towers located on each front corner with tile conical roofs.

It was listed on the National Register of Historic Places in 1993.

References

Houses on the National Register of Historic Places in West Virginia
Queen Anne architecture in West Virginia
Houses completed in 1905
Houses in Doddridge County, West Virginia
National Register of Historic Places in Doddridge County, West Virginia
1905 establishments in West Virginia